Intuition is the eighth album by Cuban-Puerto Rican singer-songwriter Angela Bofill, and was her first and only release on Capitol Records in 1988. It is produced by Norman Connors. The album peaked at position 38 of the Billboard 200 chart on January 6, 1989, and stayed on the chart for 20 weeks. The album also reached position 50 on the Billboard Top Black Albums chart.

Bofill recorded "For You And I", a song she performed live at Avery Fisher Hall, Lincoln Center in 1980 as a duet with Peabo Bryson.

In 2013, "Intuition" was re-released as an expanded edition with extra tracks, including "Fragile, Handle with Care".

Background 
After the release of her second album, "Angel of the Night", Bofill took three years to raise her daughter, now four at the time of the release of "Intuition". During that time she continued to tour, playing clubs including Blues Alley, Washington D.C., the Blue Note, New York, jazz festivals and in the UK.  

Bofill was quoted saying "This is the real Angie," and looking back on her identity as a recording artist, she reflected:

Bofill had worked with Bryson previously saying they "go way back", having performed on a television special, a Black Music Association concert in New York, and extensive touring together, "so it seemed so natural for us to make a record together now."

She had also worked previously with Norman Connors, producer of her '80's hit "Too Tough".

Production 
Bofill recorded "Intuition", with Norman Connors and Jeff Carruthers producing, along with two tracks she produced herself.

Connors produced the first single "I Just Wanna Stop" written by Ross Vanelli, and the duet "For You And I" with Peabo Bryson.

Release and reception 
Billboard album review described "delicate yet self-assured vocals on the sassy title track, the seductive "Long Gone" and the jazzy "Special Lover"...features...". Gino Vannelli's 'I Just Wanna Stop' and a Peabo Bryson duet on "For You And I."

Radio & Records review of Intuition praised the album and Bofill calling her "a statuesque, beautiful woman with a spectacular voice and dramatic style" describing "an album of variety and warmth" with "appeal to Urban, AC, and CHR formats".

Billboard Single Reviews, Black, Picks, on the release of "I Just Wanna Stop" wrote "Bofill is graceful captured on this jazz-inflected rendition."

Track listing

References

1988 albums
Angela Bofill albums
Capitol Records albums